A spokesperson, spokesman, or spokeswoman, is someone engaged or elected to speak on behalf of others.

Duties and function
In the present media-sensitive world, many organizations are increasingly likely to employ professionals who have received formal training in journalism, communications, public relations and public affairs in this role in order to ensure that public announcements are made in the most appropriate fashion and through the most appropriate channels to maximize the impact of favorable messages, and to minimize the impact of unfavorable messages.

Celebrity spokespeople such as popular local and national sports stars (such as Michael Jordan for Nike and Coca-Cola) or television and film stars (such as Beyoncé for Pepsi and L'Oreal) are often chosen as spokespeople for commercial advertising.

Responsibilities
Unlike an individual giving a personal testimonial, it is the job of a spokesperson to faithfully represent and advocate for the organization's positions, even when these conflict with their own opinion. As a result, spokespeople are generally selected from experienced, long-time employees or other people who are known to support the organization's goals.

Identity
A corporation may be represented in public by its chief executive officer, chairperson, or president, chief financial officer, counsel, or external legal advisor. In addition, on a day-to-day level and for more routine announcements, the job may be delegated to the corporate communications or investor relations departments (or equivalents), who will act as spokespeople.

As an example, in the particle physics community, large collaborations of physicists elect one (or two) spokespeople or leader(s) of the collaboration.  The spokesperson in such cases is the lead scientist of the collaboration, not a public speaker.  Each collaboration chooses the roles and responsibilities of the spokesperson for internal purposes, but typically spokespeople also have defined roles for liaising with the host laboratory and/or funding agencies.

In certain governmental organizations (i.e. city, county, school district, state government and police/fire departments), a public information officer (PIO) is the communications coordinators.
The primary responsibility of a PIOs is to provide information to the public and media as necessary and to meet the legal requirements.

See also

 Brand ambassador
 Press agent
 Press secretary
 Press service

References

 
Political occupations
Business occupations